Girona may refer to:

 Province of Girona
 Girona, a city in the northeast of Catalonia, Spain
 Girona Station (disambiguation), the name of several stations both in Girona and other cities
 Girona (ship), a galleass of the 1588 Spanish Armada 
 Girona–Costa Brava Airport, an airport located 12.5 km from Girona
 Girona FC, a Spanish football team based in Girona

See also
 Gerona (disambiguation)
 Kiruna, a city in Sweden